Novoolkhovka is a rural locality (a khutor) in Gurovskoye Rural Settlement, Olkhovsky District, Volgograd Oblast, Russia. The population was 188 as of 2010. There are four streets.

Geography 
Novoolkhovka is located in steppe, on the Olkhovka River, 31 km northwest of Olkhovka (the district's administrative centre) by road. Gurovo is the nearest rural locality.

References 

Rural localities in Olkhovsky District